Mahendran may refer to:
 Mahendran (filmmaker) (1939–2019), Indian film director, screenwriter and actor
 Mahendran (actor) (born 1991), Indian film actor
 John Mahendran, Indian film director and screenwriter 

Navalpattu Mahendran social worker